Druentica inscita is a moth of the family Mimallonidae. It is native to Mexico, and was thought to have been introduced to Hawaii for biological control of Clidemia hirta. However, recent research has suggested that the species introduced to Hawaii was misidentified, and is now known to be Druentica coralie (Herbin, 2016).

The larvae cut and fold the leaves of Clidemia hirta and Miconia acinodendrum to form a feeding shelter. They are green with brown stripes and are about 50 mm long.

References

External links
Review And Status Of Biological Control Of Clidemia In Hawaii

Moths described in 1890
Mimallonidae